Elizabeth Chuah Lamb (now Gapes; born 12 May 1991) is a high jumper from New Zealand.

Lamb won a gold medal  at the 2008 Commonwealth Youth Games in Pune, India and has also represented New Zealand at the 2010 Commonwealth Games and the 2015 Summer Universiade.

Lamb is also a fashion model and holds both a Commerce and a Science Degree from the University of Auckland.

She is married to Sam Gapes, a professional stuntman from Auckland, New Zealand.

References

New Zealand female high jumpers
1991 births
Living people
Athletes (track and field) at the 2010 Commonwealth Games
Commonwealth Games competitors for New Zealand
Oceanian Athletics Championships winners